The Journal of Early Christian Studies is an academic journal founded in 1993 and is the official publication of the North American Patristics Society. It is devoted to the study of patristics, that is Christianity in the ancient period of roughly C.E. 100–700. The current editor is Stephen Shoemaker of The University of Oregon. The journal is published quarterly in March, June, September, and December by the Johns Hopkins University Press.

The journal is abstracted and indexed in Arts and Humanities Citation Index, Current Contents/Arts & Humanities, MLA International Bibliography, and the Social Sciences Citation Index (partial coverage).

See also 
 Religion
 Early Christianity
 Patristics

External links 
 
 Journal of Early Christian Studies  at Project MUSE
 North American Patristics Society

References 

Journals about ancient Christianity
Quarterly journals
Publications established in 1993
Johns Hopkins University Press academic journals
English-language journals